Abrotonum Abrotonon, pronounced Avrotonon can refer to:

Abrotonon, 6th-century BC was a Thracian the mother of Themistocles.   There is an epigram preserved Book VII of Anthologia Palatina (Epitaphs):

Abrotonon, the name of a hetaera. Plutarch refers to an Abrotonon from Thrace in his Erotikos. In the first dialogue of Dialogues of the Courtesans of Lucian the name of an hetaera named Abrotonon is also mentioned.

Abrotonum, a plant of this name is mentioned from Pliny the Elder in his work Natural History
Abrotonum, a Phoenician city on the coast of North Africa, in the district of Tripolitana, between the Syrtes, usually identified with Sabratha though Pliny makes them different places.

References

Sources

6th-century BC Greek people
Hetairai
Thracian women
Phoenician colonies in Libya